Alexandre Maria Pinheiro Torres (27 December 1923 – 3 August 1999) was a writer, scholar, and literary critic during the Portuguese neorealist movement. 

Born in Amarente, Pinheiro Torres was educated at the University of Porto and the University of Coimbra. He was first published in 1950 and later became a noted critic of neorealism in the 1960s. In 1965 he served on the panel awarding the  Jury of the Fiction Award of the Portuguese Association of Writers to Luandino Vieira, who had been imprisoned by the Estado Novo regime for charges of terrorism. As a result Pinheiro Torres himself was arrested and held at the Cadeia do Aljube prison. He subsequently moved to Wales where he taught at the University of Cardiff, living in the city until his death in 1999 from a long illness at the age of 75.

References

1923 births
1999 deaths
Portuguese philologists
20th-century Portuguese poets
Portuguese male poets
Portuguese translators
Portuguese-language writers
Translators from English
Translators from French
Translators to Portuguese
20th-century translators
University of Porto alumni
20th-century male writers
20th-century philologists